The Frog Princes is a 2011 documentary film directed by Omar Majeed and Ryan Mullins. This film follows the story of a Montreal-based theater troupe training for a play adaptation of the fairytale The Princess and the Frog. All twenty actors in the troupe have intellectual and developmental disabilities. The film is shot as a play within a play.  The film centers on the lead actor in the play, Ray-Man (named by his parents after artist Man Ray), a young adult with Down syndrome. The film follows the personal struggles of the cast as they prepare for the play, working with the director, Dr. Stephen Snow. Snow is a trained theatre director at The Centre for the Arts in Human Development at Concordia University.

The documentary is distributed by EyeSteelFilm Productions. The film was shown on Canadian Broadcasting Corporation (CBC) on 6 August 2011 during prime time. It was also shown at the Hot Docs, the Toronto International Documentary film Festival. This film was also screened at the Abilities Arts Festival in Toronto. This film is rated PG or parental guidance suggested.

References

External links
The Frog Princes Official website
EyeSteelFilm website: The Frog Pronces page
 

2011 films
EyeSteelFilm films
Canadian documentary films
2011 documentary films
Documentary films about theatre
Documentary films about people with disability
Documentary films about Down syndrome
Quebec films
Films shot in Montreal
Disability theatre
2010s Canadian films